Pathe or Pathé may refer to:

 Pathé, a French company established in 1896
 Pathé Exchange, U.S. division of the French film company that was spun off into an independent entity 
 Pathé News, a French and British distributor of cinema newsreels, now known as British Pathé
 Pathé Records, a French and American record label
 Pathé Records (China), a producer of Chinese recordings
 Pathe, Mingin, Burma
 Pathé, one of the three components of Epicureanism#Epistemology
 M. Pathe, a Japanese film studio no longer active

People 
 Amadou Pathé Diallo (born 1964), Malian footballer
 Charles Pathé, (1863–1957), principal & co-founder of Pathé
 Pathé Bangoura (born 1984), Guinean footballer 
 Pathé Ciss (born 1994), Senegalese footballer

See also 
 Gaumont-Pathe Archives
 Les Cinémas Gaumont Pathé
 MGM-Pathé Communications